Kakrebihar is a Shikhara Hindu and Buddhist temple in Birendranagar, Surkhet, Karnali Province. It was built in the 12th century and it spreads over 180 hectares of land. The temple was restored in September 2021.

References 

Hindu temples in Karnali Province
Tourist attractions in Nepal
12th-century establishments in Nepal
Buildings and structures in Surkhet District
Buddhist temples in Nepal